Gesg or GESG may refer to:

 Gesk, North Khorasan Province
 Gask, Iran, in South Khorasan Province
 GESG, the Grupo Ecológico Sierra Gorda founded by Martha Isabel Ruiz Corzo